The Big Bang was, according to the prevailing cosmological theory of the universe's early development, the event that led to the formation of the universe.

Big Bang may also refer to:

Science
 Big Bang nucleosynthesis, the production of certain hydrogen isotopes early in the universe's existence
 Cold Big Bang, an alternative theory in which the start of the universe is at absolute zero

Arts, entertainment, and media

Films
 Big Bang (film), a 2007 Korean film by Jeong-woo Park
 The Big Bang (1987 film), also referred to as Le Big-Bang, an X-rated animated science fiction fantasy film, directed by Picha
 The Big Bang (1989 film), a documentary by James Toback
 The Big Bang (2011 film), a thriller starring Sienna Guillory and Antonio Banderas
 The Big Bang (2019 film), a Malayalam-language short film

Music

Groups
BigBang (band), stylized as BIGBANG, a South Korean boy band
Big Bang (British band), a British electronic synthpop duo
Bigbang (Norwegian band), also stylized as BigBang and BIGBANG, a Norwegian rock trio

Albums
 Big Bang (2006 album), eponymous album by the South Korean boy band
 Big Bang (2009 album), eponymous album by the South Korean boy band
 Big Bang (Los Enanitos Verdes album), 1994
 Big Bang (Magdallan album), 1992
 Big Bang (Os Paralamas do Sucesso album), 1989
 Big Bang (Waltari album), 1995
 Big Bang!, a 1989 album by Fuzzbox
 Big Bang!!!, an album by Shoko Nakagawa
 The Big Bang (Busta Rhymes album), 2006
 The Big Bang (Dom & Roland album), 2011
 The Big Bang!: Best of the MC5, a 2000 album by MC5
 The Big Bang – The Essential Collection, an album by TNT

Songs
 "Big Bang", a song by Bad Religion from No Control
 "Big Bang", a song by Cursive from Happy Hollow
 "Big Bang", a 2007 song by Les Horribles Cernettes
 "The Big Bang" (song), a 2010 song by Rock Mafia
 "The Big Bang", a song by Godley & Creme from Goodbye Blue Sky
 "The Big Bang", a song by Johnny Mandel from soundtrack for Caddyshack

Television
 The Big Bang (TV series), a children's TV science programme shown on ITV from 1996 to 2004
 "The Big Bang" (Atlanta), 2016
 "The Big Bang" (Charlie Jade), 2005
 "The Big Bang" (Doctor Who), 2010
  "The Big Bang Theory" (TV Series), 2007

Other uses in arts, entertainment, and media
 Big Bang (book), a 2004 book by Simon Singh about the cosmological model
 Big Bang, a game mode in the puzzle video game Puyo Puyo Tetris
 Big Bang Comics, Gary Carlson and Chris Ecker's retro-style comic book
 Hublot Big Bang, a wristwatch
 Big-Bang Cannon, a toy

Events
 Big Bang (comics), a Milestone Comics event
 Big Bang (financial markets), the deregulation of financial markets in the United Kingdom in 1986
 The Big Bang Fair, or The Big Bang UK Young Scientists and Engineers Fair, a celebration of science, technology, engineering and maths for young people
 Operation Big Bang, "British Bang" or "Big Bang"; one of the largest conventional explosions in history
 ROH The Big Bang!, a wrestling event

Other uses
 Big Bang (faction), a faction within the Democratic Party, a political party in Italy
 Big bang adoption, instant changeover as a system adoption process
 Big-bang firing order, an aspect of some motorcycle engines
 System 7 or Big Bang, a Macintosh operating system

See also

 A Bigger Bang, a 2005 album by The Rolling Stones
Big Bang Theory (disambiguation)

cs:Teorie Velkého třesku